Punjab International Sports Festival (also named Punjab National Sports Festival) is a sports festival held in Punjab, Pakistan. Its inauguration ceremony was held on November 6, 2012, with the music concert. 1,381 athletes participated in the festival from 24 different countries.

References 

Festivals in Punjab, Pakistan
Sport in Punjab, Pakistan
Punjabi festivals
Sports festivals in Pakistan